T/TCP (Transactional Transmission Control Protocol) was a variant of the Transmission Control Protocol (TCP).
It was an experimental TCP extension for efficient transaction-oriented (request/response) service.
It was developed to fill the gap between TCP and UDP, by Bob Braden in 1994.
Its definition can be found in RFC 1644 (that obsoletes RFC 1379). It is faster than TCP and delivery reliability is comparable to that of TCP.

T/TCP suffers from several major security problems as described by Charles Hannum in September 1996. It has not gained widespread popularity.

RFC 1379 and RFC 1644 that define T/TCP were moved to Historic Status in May 2011 by RFC 6247 for security reasons.

Alternatives
TCP Fast Open is a more recent alternative.

See also
 TCP Cookie Transactions

Further reading 
 Richard Stevens, Gary Wright, "TCP/IP Illustrated: TCP for transactions, HTTP, NNTP, and the UNIX domain protocols" (Volume 3 of TCP/IP Illustrated) // Addison-Wesley, 1996, 2000.  Part 1 "TCP for Transactions". Chapters 1-12, pages 1–159

References

External links
 Example exploit of T/TCP in a post to Bugtraq by Vasim Valejev

Transmission Control Protocol
Internet Standards